Commotion Ltd v Rutty [2006] IRLR 171 (EAT) is an Employment Appeal Tribunal case in which an employer, who denied its staff flexible working time, was found in breach of the Employment Rights Act 1996 for failing to have any lawful reason.

Facts
Mrs Rutty was a warehouse assistant in Tonbridge, Kent packing educational toys for Commotion Ltd’s business. She and her husband had to take over care for their grand daughter, Jasmine. Mrs Rutty asked the warehouse supervisor, Mr Wood, for flexible working time, as a three-day week. She was denied on the basis that the employer wanted to keep her as a full-time member, by a Mr Brown. She appealed, and Mr Coote rejected her claim again, writing back saying that the company's policy was to ‘help to create a team spirit by having a uniform working day’. She resigned and claimed her application was unreasonably rejected, constructive unfair dismissal and indirect discrimination.

Judgment

Tribunal
The Tribunal held that there were no grounds on which the employer had shown that flexible working could not be accommodated, and hence its decision was based on incorrect facts.

Employment Appeal Tribunal
Judge Burke QC upheld the tribunal, whose decision was not perverse or contrary to the law set out in the Employment Rights Act 1996 ss 80F-H.

See also
ERA 1996

Notes

External links
 Judgment on BAILII

2005 in case law
2005 in British law
Employment Appeal Tribunal cases